The Insurrection Act of 1807 is a United States federal law that empowers the President of the United States to deploy U.S. military and federalized National Guard troops within the United States in particular circumstances, such as to suppress civil disorder, insurrection, or rebellion.

The act provides a "statutory exception" to the Posse Comitatus Act of 1878, which limits the use of military personnel under federal command for law enforcement purposes within the United States.

Before invoking the powers under the Act,  requires the President to first publish a proclamation ordering the insurgents to disperse. As part of the Posse Comitatus Act of 1878, these provisions are now codified as amended.

There are Constitutional exceptions to Posse Comitatus restrictions rooted in the President's own constitutional authority. Defense Department guidelines describe "homeland defense" as a "constitutional exception" to Posse Comitatus restriction, meaning that measures necessary to guarantee National Security from external threats are not subject to the same limitations.

Purpose and content
The Act empowers the U.S. president to call into service the U.S. Armed Forces and the National Guard: 
 when requested by a state's legislature, or governor if the legislature cannot be convened, to address an insurrection against that state,
 to address an insurrection, in any state, which makes it impracticable to enforce the law, or 
 to address an insurrection, domestic violence, unlawful combination or conspiracy, in any state, which results in the deprivation of constitutionally secured rights, and where the state is unable, fails, or refuses to protect said rights.

The 1807 Act replaced the earlier Calling Forth Act of 1792, which had allowed for federalization of state militias, with similar language that allowed either for federalization of state militias or use of the regular armed forces in the case of rebellion against a state government. The Act did not provide a criminal penalty for insurrection, which was instead introduced by the Confiscation Act of 1862.

The 1807 Act has been modified twice. In 1861, a new section was added allowing the federal government to use the National Guard and armed forces against the will of the state government in the case of "rebellion against the authority of the government of the United States," in anticipation of continued unrest after the Civil War. In 1871, the Third Enforcement Act revised this section to protect Black Americans from attacks by the Ku Klux Klan. The language added at that time allows the federal government to use the act to enforce the Equal Protection Clause of the Fourteenth Amendment to the United States Constitution. This section of the act was invoked during the Reconstruction era, and again during desegregation fights during the Civil Rights Era.

The chief clause of the Insurrection Act, in its original 1807 wording (since updated to modern legal English), reads:

An Act authorizing the employment of the land and naval forces of the United States, in cases of insurrections
Be it enacted by the Senate and House of Representatives of the United States of America in Congress assembled, That in all cases of insurrection, or obstruction to the laws, either of the United States, or of any individual state or territory, where it is lawful for the President of the United States to call forth the militia for the purpose of suppressing such insurrection, or of causing the laws to be duly executed, it shall be lawful for him to employ, for the same purposes, such part of the land or naval force of the United States, as shall be judged necessary, having first observed all the pre-requisites of the law in that respect.In 2016, Public Law 114-328 was amended to include Guam and the US Virgin Islands under Ch. 13 jurisdiction. §252: "Use of militia and armed forces to enforce Federal authority" currently reads:Whenever the President considers that unlawful obstructions, combinations, or assemblages, or rebellion against the authority of the United States, make it impracticable to enforce the laws of the United States in any State by the ordinary course of judicial proceedings, he may call into Federal service such of the militia of any State, and use such of the armed forces, as he considers necessary to enforce those laws or to suppress the rebellion.

Application
The Insurrection Act has been invoked throughout American history. In the 19th century, it was invoked during conflicts with Native Americans.  In the late 19th and early 20th centuries, it was invoked during labor conflicts.  Later in the 20th century, it was used to enforce federally mandated desegregation, with Presidents Dwight D. Eisenhower and John F. Kennedy invoking the Act in opposition to the affected states' political leaders to enforce court-ordered desegregation.  More recently, governors have requested and received support following looting in the aftermath of Hurricane Hugo in 1989 and during the 1992 Los Angeles riots.

In 2006, the George W. Bush administration considered intervening in the state of Louisiana's response to Hurricane Katrina despite the refusal from Louisiana's governor, but this was inconsistent with past precedent, politically difficult, and potentially unconstitutional. A provision of the John Warner National Defense Authorization Act for Fiscal Year 2007, added by an unidentified sponsor, amended the Insurrection act to permit military intervention without state consent, in case of an emergency that hindered the enforcement of laws.  Bush signed this amendment into law, but some months after it was enacted, all fifty state governors issued a joint statement against it, and the changes were repealed in January 2008.

On June 1, 2020, President Donald Trump warned that he would invoke the Act in response to the George Floyd protests following the murder of George Floyd. In his official statement, Trump urged "every governor to deploy the National Guard in sufficient numbers" to re-establish civil law and order "until the violence has been quelled". Federal officials talked Trump out of invoking the Insurrection Act. The National Guard were called during the 2021 storming of the United States Capitol, but not active-duty military.

Calls for reform
In 2020, Senator Richard Blumenthal introduced the CIVIL Act (Curtailing Insurrection act Violations of Individuals' Liberties Act) to restrict presidential authorities outlined in the Insurrection Act. The legislation sought to require the President to consult with Congress before invoking the Act, restricting the President's activation of troops under the Act to fourteen days without explicit congressional authorization, requiring the President, Secretary of Defense, and Attorney General to issue a joint certification Congress affirming a state's reluctance or inability to enforce the laws thus justifying the use of the military, and prohibiting active duty troops from performing law enforcement actions unless authorized by law.

In 2022, the Brennan Center for Justice submitted a proposal to the January 6 house committee, which investigated the January 6 United States Capitol attack, to reform the Insurrection Act with the intent of clarifying vague language and updating its contents to reflect issues of the present. Some of the language the BCJ identified as needing clarification include the section outlining the circumstances in which the President can invoke the Act that reads "any insurrection,
domestic violence, unlawful combination, or conspiracy" are legally accepted criteria for the law's invocation. BCJ argues that this criteria is broad and can possibly be interpreted to allow the President to invoke the Act to address any conspiracy, large or small, to include protests or petty criminal acts with active duty military forces. The BCJ also argued for Congress to rewrite the line "The President, by using the militia or the armed forces, or both, or by any other means," as the inclusion of by any other means can leave open the possibility of a force not formally under the control of the Department of Defense being authorized by the President to act under the auspices of the Insurrection Act.

Invocations

See also
Martial law in the United States
List of national emergencies in the United States
Martin v. Mott

References

External links

 Proclamation 157 – Declaring that Peace, Order, Tranquillity, and Civil Authority Now Exists in and Throughout the Whole of the United States of America (20 August 1866)
 Proclamation On The Embargo – President Thomas Jefferson (19 April 1808)
 Proclamation 3204 – Obstruction of Justice in the State of Arkansas, President Dwight Eisenhower (invoking the Insurrection Act to send troops to Little Rock, Arkansas, to enforce school desegregation orders)(23 September 1957)
 Executive Order 11,053 –  Providing Assistance for the Removal of Unlawful Obstructions of Justice in the State of Mississippi, President John F. Kennedy (September 30, 1962)
 "The Posse Comitatus Act and Related Matters: The Use of the Military to Execute Civilian Law," Updated November 6, 2018, Congressional Research Service. https://fas.org/sgp/crs/natsec/R42659.pdf

United States federal criminal legislation
United States federal defense and national security legislation
1807 in American law
Presidency of Thomas Jefferson